Zero is the common name for the evolution of the proprietary game engine created by Pandemic Studios. It was used first in the game Battlezone II: Combat Commander and later used in several Star Wars games including the popular Battlefront series. Battlezone II: Combat Commander and Dark Reign 2 both feature an in-engine editor accessible via commands. It was given additional 3D functionality with Dark Reign 2, which was further improved upon for Army Men: RTS.

The engine was revamped for Star Wars: The Clone Wars to accommodate consoles and third person gameplay. The engine was again retooled for Star Wars: Battlefront and the level editor was made a separate entity from the game engine. A set of modding tools including ZeroEdit, the new level creation tool, were released for use with Star Wars: Battlefront on December 23, 2004.  An updated version of the tools were released on February 2, 2006 for Star Wars: Battlefront II. Pandemic used Zero as their primary engine for several of their games developed in their Los Angeles, California studio. Havok physics engine capabilities were integrated with Zero for Mercenaries: Playground of Destruction. A new engine was built for 2008's Mercenaries 2: World in Flames.

Games using Zero
Battlezone II: Combat Commander (1999)
Dark Reign 2 (2000)
Army Men: RTS (2002)
Star Wars: The Clone Wars (2002)
Star Wars: Battlefront (2004)
Star Wars: Battlefront II (2005)
Mercenaries: Playground of Destruction (2005)

References

1999 software
Video game engines